The Havana Pitbulls was a professional wrestling tag team, consisting of Rocky Romero and Ricky Reyes, who worked for Ring of Honor as a member of The Rottweilers. They also worked for Pro Wrestling Guerrilla, Empire Wrestling Federation, Ultimate Pro Wrestling, and Liberty States Wrestling.

History

Independent circuit
In September 1999, Romero and Reyes—using the tag team name Los Cubanitos—were awarded Empire Wrestling Federation (EWF)'s Tag Team Championship. They were later stripped of the title on December 4, 1999.

Meanwhile, in the Ultimate Pro Wrestling promotion in April 2000, Los Cubanitos won the Tag Team title from Jobbers-R-Us, holding it for approximately one month before losing it to The Ballard Brothers.

On April 29, 2001, they won the EWF Tag Team Championship from Aggravated Assault, whom they traded the title with once between April 2001 and February 2002. Los Cubanitos, however, were stripped of the title on July 1, 2002 for injuring their opponents. In September 2003, they won the title (under their new name The Havana Pitbulls) for a fourth time by defeating Los Chivos. They held the title until January 2004, when they were defeated by The West Coast Ryders. They won the title for the fifth and final time in April 2005, once again defeating Los Chivos. They, however, were stripped of the title on May 25.

Ring of Honor
After several unsuccessful attempts at winning the Ring of Honor (ROH)'s World Tag Team Championship, on August 7, 2004, at ROH Testing the Limits, the Havana Pitbulls (with Julius Smokes) defeated Colt Cabana and CM Punk for the title.

After several successful defenses, the Havana Pitbulls lost the ROH World Tag Team Championship to Dan Maff and B. J. Whitmer on February 19, 2005, at ROH 3rd Anniversary Part One. Also that year, they won the 2005 Trios Tournament with Homicide.

In 2007 the Havana Pitbulls had a brief reunion, ending on January 27, 2007 when Romero walked out on Reyes during a match against The Briscoe Brothers at ROH Battle of the Icons.

Championships and accomplishments
Empire Wrestling Federation
EWF Tag Team Championship (5 times)

Ring of Honor
ROH Tag Team Championship (1 time)
Trios Tournament (2005) - with Homicide

SoCal Uncensored
Tag Team of the Year (2001)
Ultimate Pro Wrestling
UPW Tag Team Championship (1 time)

Media
 Let the Gates of Hell Open: The Best of The Rottweilers – ROH DVD.

References

External links
The Havana Pitbulls at the Online World of Wrestling

Independent promotions teams and stables
Ring of Honor teams and stables